Roger Belisle (born October 31, 1947) is a Canadian former professional ice hockey player. He was selected by the Montreal Canadiens in the 1st round (2nd overall) of the 1968 NHL Amateur Draft.

Belisle played with the Muskegon Mohawks of the International Hockey League during the 1968–69 season.

Career statistics

References

External links

Living people
1947 births
Canadian ice hockey centres
Montreal Canadiens draft picks
Muskegon Mohawks players
National Hockey League first-round draft picks